People who served as the mayor of the City of Canterbury are:

References

Mayors Canterbury
Canterbury, Mayors
Mayors of Canterbury